Weebles is a range of children's roly-poly toys that originated in 1971 by the US toy company Playskool. They are egg-shaped, so tipping one causes a weight located at the bottom-center to be raised. Once released, the Weeble is restored by gravity to an upright position. Weebles have been designed with a variety of shapes, including some designed to look like people or animals.

The catchphrase "Weebles wobble, but they don't fall down" was used in advertising during their rise in popularity in the 1970s and during successive relaunches in the early 2000s. The line was coined by advertising executive Walter Cohen at Benton & Bowles when he and his partner Bernard Most were assigned to the account in 1971.
The pair (as the creative team Bernie & Walter) used the phrase when they created the first TV commercials for the new product.

The Weebles 1971–2011 Price Guide and Index lists and shows every Weeble model made over the preceding 40 years.  There are 116 Weebles in total (83 regular; 21 peelable; 12 tumbling) including all egg-shaped sizes and variations made during 1971–1983.  In 2011, Hasbro started making a new line of larger egg-shaped Weebles and had produced 42 new Weebles as of July 2011.

A wide range of accessories was available for the Weebles, including vehicles, buildings and furniture. Some sets had themes, such as the Weebles circus set.

In the United Kingdom, Weebles were manufactured and marketed by Airfix under licence from 1973 onwards.

Design principle

Weeble is shaped like an egg—in order for the physics principles to work as intended, the shape must have a bottom which is a more or less smooth (unfaceted) hemisphere (to allow the Weeble to roll) and from the central vertical axis the shape must be nearly cylindrically symmetrical (that is, any plane cut through the vertical axis line must produce close to the same profile).  Next, the shape must be filled with two basic types of unmixed solids, and the volume of the lighter solid must be greater than that of the heavier solid.  Next, the overall shape must have constant positive curvature.  Next, the relationship between the heavy solid and the light solid must be such that any orientation of the object off of the vertical axis line must cause the object's centroid to raise and to become offset.  Lastly, the object must have only one position in which it can achieve stable mechanical equilibrium.

Combining these characteristics produces a basic Weeble.  In theory, it is not possible to have a Weeble with a centroid that is too low to achieve a stable mechanical equilibrium.

List of playsets 
Numerous playsets were made and marketed in the United States throughout the 1970s including a Haunted House, Treehouse, Tarzan,  Camper, Playground, Marina, Circus, Fun House, Mickey Mouse Club Set, Mickey Mouse Magic Kingdom, Western Theme Set, Weekender and others.  Playsets often came with certain figures, though these could also be purchased separately.

There are 44 Weebles sets that include at least one Weebles figure and a vehicle, or larger sets made between 1972 and 1982.

A new line of Weebles was created in 2004 that were not egg-shaped but rather shaped like different animals.  These were produced for a couple of years.

Weebleville (2004–2005)
Source:
Weebleville Town Center
Weeschool
Wegetable Stand
Weebles Barn Dance
Weehicles (four sets)
Weemobile
Wescue Wagon
Weegoaway Camper
Weebly Wobbly Tree House
Figures
Mini Weebles Pals (larger figures)

Storybook World (2006) 
Source:
Hansel and Gretel's Wobbly Adventure
Jack and Jill's Wobbly Adventure
Goldilocks' Adventure Cottage
Cinderella Carriage
Weebly Knight & Ogre Adventure
Weebalot Castle
Figures

New Weebles (since 2011) 
 Musical Treehouse
 Wobble-Go-Round
 Figures
 Weebles on the Bus
 Bobblin' Boat
 Wobblin' Wings
 Turnin' Whirlin' Racers
 Turn 'n Tumble Home
 Rock 'n Wobble Playground

In popular culture
 In 1975, the Macy's Thanksgiving Day Parade introduced a balloon of the standard Weeble design, which lasted until 1978. Almost 20 years later, balloonicles with the Weebles characters Tibbey, Tooey, and Bumpus made their debut.

See also 
 Weebl and Bob
 Okiagari-koboshi
 Daruma doll
 Gömböc

References

1970s toys
Toy figurines
Hasbro products